Surbiton is an unincorporated hamlet in Fertile Valley Rural Municipality No. 285, Saskatchewan, Canada. The hamlet is located 15 km south west of the Town of Outlook west of highway 45 and south of highway 15 at the intersection of Range Road 94 & the Canadian Pacific Railway Tichfield Junction Sub.

The community was named for Surbiton, Surrey (now Greater London), England at the suggestion of Mrs. William Hopkins.

See also

List of communities in Saskatchewan
Hamlets of Saskatchewan

References

Fertile Valley No. 285, Saskatchewan
Unincorporated communities in Saskatchewan